Dalibor Đapa (born 23 October 1984) is a Serbian professional basketball player who plays as a Power forward for Šentjur of the Slovenian League.

External links 
 Profile at aba-liga.com
 Profile at eurobasket.com

Living people
1984 births
ABA League players
Alba Fehérvár players
Basketball League of Serbia players
BC Budivelnyk players
BC Odesa players
CS Universitatea Cluj-Napoca (men's basketball) players
CSU Pitești players
Czarni Słupsk players
KK Krka players
KK Lions/Swisslion Vršac players
KK Spartak Subotica players
OKK Beograd players
Power forwards (basketball)
Serbian expatriate basketball people in Hungary
Serbian expatriate basketball people in Italy
Serbian expatriate basketball people in Poland
Serbian expatriate basketball people in Romania
Serbian expatriate basketball people in Slovenia
Serbian expatriate basketball people in Ukraine
Serbian men's basketball players
Vanoli Cremona players